= Constituency PSW-135 =

Reserved constituency of the Provincial Assembly of Sindh, Pakistan

PSW-135
- Provincial Reserved constituency for the Provincial Assembly of Sindh

Current constituency

PSW-135 is a reserved Constituency for female in the Provincial Assembly of Sindh.

== See also ==
- Sindh
